Lish McBride is an American writer of urban fantasy. Her first book was Hold Me Closer, Necromancer, a young-adult novel about a fast-food fry cook who learns he is a necromancer. It won a 2011 Washington State Book Award and was a finalist for the William C. Morris YA Debut Award. Her second novel, Necromancing the Stone, was released in September 2012.

McBride grew up outside Seattle. She moved to Seattle when she was 21, then to University of New Orleans for her MFA in fiction. After completing her degree, she returned to Seattle, where she lived as of late 2010.

Bibliography

Necromancer Series 

 Hold Me Closer, Necromancer  (October 2010) 
 Necromancing the Stone (September 2012)
 "Halfway Through the Wood" (short story) and You Make Me Feel So Young" (short story) in Freaks & Other Family (Dec 21, 2016 )
 "We Should Get Jerseys 'Cause We Make a Good Team" (short story) in the anthology Cornered: 14 Stories of Bullying and Defiance 
 "Death & Waffles" (short story) in 
 "Heads Will Roll" (short story)

Firebug series 

 Firebug (September 2014)
 Pyromantic (March 2017), sequel to Firebug
 "Burnt Sugar" (short story) in released on Tor.com

Other
 "School of Fish (short story) in What to Read in the Rain anthology
 "Just the Mustache" published in The Normal School: A Literary Magazine

See also

References

External links
 
 
 

American young adult novelists
Urban fantasy writers
Writers from Seattle
Living people
Year of birth missing (living people)
Place of birth missing (living people)
Women science fiction and fantasy writers
American women novelists
Women writers of young adult literature
American children's writers
Novelists from Washington (state)
21st-century American women